Ritesh Rajan (born October 23, 1988) is an American actor. He portrayed Linus Ahluwalia on the Freeform television series Stitchers (2015–2017) and also appeared as Mowgli's father in the 2016 adventure film The Jungle Book.

Early life 
Rajan was born in White Plains, New York. He attended Mahopac High School in Mahopac, New York. Rajan trained at the Stella Adler Studio of Acting while attending New York University's Tisch School of the Arts.

Filmography

Film

Video games

Television

References

External links 
 

American male television actors
American male actors of Indian descent
1988 births
Male actors from New York (state)
Tisch School of the Arts alumni
Male actors from Los Angeles
People from Mahopac, New York
21st-century American male actors
Living people